Devil's food cake is a moist, rich chocolate layer cake. It is considered a counterpart to the white or yellow angel food cake. Because of differing recipes and changing ingredient availability over the 20th century, it is difficult to precisely qualify what distinguishes devil's food from the more standard chocolate cake. However, it traditionally has more chocolate than a regular chocolate cake, making it darker in colour and with a heavier texture. The cake is usually paired with a rich chocolate frosting.

Devil's food cake was invented in the United States in the early twentieth century, with the recipe in print as early as 1905.

Ingredients

Devil's food cake traditionally uses unsweetened chocolate baking squares in lieu of unsweetened cocoa powder. However, contemporary recipes typically use cocoa powder for its convenience over the more traditional chocolate baking squares. Also, because of its reduced amount of cocoa butter, cocoa powder has a more intense chocolate flavor than unsweetened chocolate. Moreover, coffee is frequently added as a liquid to enhance the chocolate flavor. Some recipes use hot or boiling water as the cake's main liquid, rather than milk. Its antithetical counterpart, the angel food cake, is a very light white cake that uses stiffly beaten egg whites and no dairy.

Devil's food cake is sometimes distinguished from other chocolate cakes by the use of additional baking soda (sodium bicarbonate), which raises the pH level and makes the cake a deeper and darker mahogany color. Devil's food cake incorporates butter (or a substitute), flour, and less egg than other chocolate cakes.

See also
 Angel food cake
 List of desserts
 Mississippi mud pie
 Red velvet cake

References

External links
 History of cakes, including Devil's Food Cake @ The Food Timeline

Chocolate desserts
American cakes
Layer cakes
Chocolate cakes